Presence Of Mind is the debut album for Swedish AOR/Melodic Rock band Alyson Avenue originally released in 2000, best known for being fronted by former lead vocalist Anette Olzon who also fronted Nightwish.

Reception
The debut album was released in November 2000 and the interest and reviews were far beyond the band's expectations - including a 93/100 rating in Japanese magazine Burrn! which was followed by massive sales.

Track listing

 Free Like the Wind - 3:29
 Every Now and Then - 3:51
 Lost and Lonely - 4:23
 Tell Me You Love Me (or Leave Me) - 5:41
 One Desperate Heart - 3:36
 Call Out My Name - 3:56
 Walk Away - 3:21
 It's in Your Eyes - 4:23
 Without Your Love - 4:05
 All This Time - 4:43
 One Touch - 4:17

Personnel 
Anette Olzon - Vocals 
Niclas Olsson - Keyboards
Jarmo Piiroinen - Guitars
Thomas Löyskä - Bass
Roger Landin - Drums

Alyson Avenue albums
2000 debut albums